Schlafen family member 12 is a protein in humans that is encoded by the SLFN12 gene.

References

Further reading 

Human proteins